Christian Berishaj, better known by his stage name JMSN (pronounced Jameson), is an American singer, songwriter, record producer, multi-instrumentalist, music engineer and mixer. His debut album, Priscilla, was released in 2012; he wrote and produced the album by himself and directed the music videos accompanying its release.

Life and career 

Christian Berishaj was born in Dallas, Texas, to Albanian immigrant parents and raised in Eastpointe, Michigan. He began playing guitar in fourth grade and started working on Pro Tools at the age of twelve. He has been in a relationship with Alexa Demie since 2017.

2004–2011 

Berishaj learned how to play other instruments and began holding neighborhood garage performances with his band, Snowhite, formed with three other members. He attended South Lake High School in St. Clair Shores. Eventually, he began mailing demos and performance videos to record labels, with his mother cold calling A&R representatives. By eighteen, Christian had written and recorded a whole album, Love Arcade, on which he plays all the instruments. He secured a recording contract with Atlantic Records, after turning down an offer from Sony Records, with his band in 2005. His demos had impressed David Wimmer and Leslie Dweck of Atlantic, who were taken by Christian's drive and ambition. Love Arcade was released in 2006 with the band credited as Love Arcade, the other members served as the touring band only, not performing on the record. He was known as Snowhite while in the group. After three years together, the band broke up.

Christian left Detroit for Los Angeles. He began working on his solo debut with The Summer Obsession. His song, "1, 2, 3, Turn Around" was featured in the 2009 film, Fired Up. He used the money earned from the licensing to fund a music video for the song "When She Turns 18", which resulted in him signing to Universal Motown Records as Christian TV in January 2010. On July 29, 2010 Christian TV made his network television debut, performing "When She Turns 18" live on So You Think You Can Dance. In October, Christian released his first mixtape entitled "Who the F*ck Is Christian TV" for free. During this time he also went on tour supporting Pete Wentz and his new band Black Cards in the UK. Christian began working on his debut album, Diary of an 80's Baby with production by Kevin Rudolf, No I.D., and Christian himself. He also co-wrote a song for Japanese pop singer, Hitomi's album Spirit. Universal Motown was later shut down and he did not appear on the rosters of the resulting Universal Republic Records or Motown Records.

2012–2015 

After leaving his label, Christian started his own White Room Records and adopted the moniker, JMSN. He released his debut album, Priscilla on January 11, 2012. Christian wrote and produced the R&B album, straying from his pop-rock/electropop roots. In the album, he pursues darker emotional themes over melancholic melodies and beats that The Guardian described as "spaced out" and compared to The Weeknd. Self-directed videos for "Alone", "Hotel" and "Something" were released to accompany the album's release, while a video for "Girl I Used to Know" was released under his previous stage name. In April, R&B singer Usher told music magazine NME that JMSN was his "favorite new act".

In August 2012, Christian produced "Nibiru" for West Coast rapper Ab-Soul. Subsequently, in October of the same year, Christian announced that he and the rapper would be releasing a collaborative project together. The lead single for Ab-Soul and JMSN's collaborative album, Unit 6, titled "You're Gone", features vocals from both artists, as well as production from Christian. Recently, Unit 6 was revealed to be shelved due to business disagreements which may or may not make the light of day.

After the success of Priscilla, Christian (as JMSN) released his album Pllaje, on November 5, 2013. This garnered him more acclaim in the community, and he gained recognition in the music industry. Christian began collaborating with other artists, like J. Cole and The Game, while releasing Pllaje'''s visuals through his YouTube channel for: "Love Myself", "The One" and "Thing U Miss". In 2013, his North American tour took him to over 20 cities where he both opened and headlined the shows.

On December 9, 2014 Christian released his second album The Blue Album. In 2015, he toured to promote the album.

 2016–present 

On March 1, 2016, Christian released a soulful and jazzy single, "Cruel Intentions". The release of this song was followed by the singles: "Most of All", "Hypnotized," and a Snoh Aalegra remix of "Cruel Intentions". The first three songs were included on JMSN's third album, It Is. which was released on May 6, 2016.

In August 2016, Christian revealed that he is the elusive artist Pearl, shortly after dropping Pearl's new album, Closer. In a handwritten letter posted to his social media, he wrote, "I started Pearl to have another creative outlet besides JMSN. White Room Records is about freedom. Be what you want to be."

On April 28, 2017, JMSN released the album Whatever Makes U Happy on White Room Records.

On September 21, 2018, JMSN released the album Velvet'' on White Room Records.

On September 3, 2021, JMSN released the album "Heals me" on White Room Records.

Artistry 

Berishaj has cited Whitney Houston, Prince, Phil Collins, Fiona Apple, Radiohead, Hatiras, and Boys Noize as influences on his music.

Discography

Studio albums

EPs

Singles

As lead artist

As a featured artist

Guest appearances

Videography

Music videos

References 

1983 births
Living people
21st-century American male singers
21st-century American singers
American contemporary R&B singers
American hip hop record producers
American dance musicians
Midwest hip hop musicians
American male pop singers
American male singer-songwriters
American hip hop singers
People from Eastpointe, Michigan
Atlantic Records artists
Mercury Records artists
Singer-songwriters from Michigan
American people of Albanian descent
Alternative R&B musicians